Sex Dirt distills a single episode of Negativland's radio program Over the Edge, broadcast on KPFA.  

Unlike previous volumes of the Over The Edge series, this disc represents a live, improvisational performance by the group as a whole.  Most Over The Edge Broadcasts do not include all of Negativland, and are mostly theme based rather than music based.  This show, however, focuses heavily on the performance angle, as seen in many of Negativland's live shows.  Also unusual is the use of a piano in the performance.  While the recording is theme-oriented, and still has the same flavor as the majority of Over The Edge Broadcasts, the format is somewhat different and much more "musical."

This album was released in 1995 on Negativland's Seeland label.   The CD package includes a detailed "Sexual I.Q. Test" insert and a custom-printed moist towelette.

Track listing

A Special Opening (0:56)
Sex Dirt (7:59)
Shake Your Pants #2 (4:36)
Pump Gag (3:46)
Lick The Crack (7:03)
Penis And Sperm (3:01)
Gonna Sing Now (3:39)
Too Much Spurt (2:39)
Digital Fantasy Man (5:05)
Almost Lost It There (2:22)
Don't Stop Doin' It (2:03)
I Don't Want Anything In The Toilet (5:28)
Seat Bee Sate (6:16)
Shake Your Pants #1 (5:37)
Getting Sexy (7:20)

Personnel
David Wills
Chris Grigg
Mark Hosler
Don Joyce
Byram Abbott
Allison Holt
Cindy Mah
Peter Dayton
Some friend of David's
Jessica from KPFA

References

Negativland albums
1995 compilation albums